RISC is an abbreviation for reduced instruction set computer.

RISC or Risc may also refer to:

Computing
 Berkeley RISC
 Classic RISC pipeline, early RISC architecture 
 CompactRISC, National Semiconductor family of RISC architectures
 MIPS RISC/os, a discontinued UNIX operating system developed by MIPS Computer Systems
 OpenRISC, a project to develop a series of open-source hardware
 PA-RISC, an instruction set architecture developed by Hewlett-Packard
 Research Institute for Symbolic Computation in Linz, Austria
 RISC iX, discontinued UNIX operating system
 RISC OS, operating system created by Acorn Computers
 RISC OS character set, used in the Acorn Archimedes
 History of RISC OS, Acorn Computers OS history
 RISC OS Open Ltd., (ROOL) a company engaged in computer software and IT consulting
 Risc PC, Acorn computer launched in 1994
 RISC-V, an open-source hardware instruction set architecture (ISA) based on established reduced instruction set computer (RISC) principles.

Other
 RNA-induced silencing complex, a multiprotein complex involved in gene silencing
 Rockwell Integrated Sciences Center, a building on the campus of Lafayette College.

See also
Risk (disambiguation)